Sophia Abdi Noor is a Kenyan Politician serving as a Member of Parliament Ijara Constituency. She is the first woman to be elected as a Member of the 10th Parliament of Kenya from the North Eastern Region of Kenya.

She fights for the rights of the marginalized in the Community through Gender Equality Campaigns.[Women's Islamic Initiative in Spirituality and Equality]

Early life and education 
She has a Diploma in Community Development and has been very vocal in  advocating against retrogressive cultural practices in her community .

She recently obtained a BA in Development Studies at Arusha Tanzania and a Masters in Executive Management development from USIU.

Political career 

In the August 2017 elections, Noor emerged victorious in the  Ijara constituency elections .

Work 
After her Diploma, Noor worked with international bodies like Oxfam, Save the Children, CARE International, and World Vision, MSF-Spain, UNHCR, and MIKONO International.

Awards 

 Social justice award from the International Leadership Institute in Minnesota
 The International Democracy Fellowship from the Lees Aspen Center for Governance in Washington DC
 The Father John Kaiser Human Rights Award of the Year in 2007 by the Law Society of Kenya

References 

Living people
Kenyan politicians
Year of birth missing (living people)